Verner Hans Puurand (until 1938 Puurmann; 14 September 1904 – 12 June 1983) was an Estonian Naval officer and politician. From 1973 to 1977 he was a minister of Estonian government-in-exile.

He was born in Narva. In 1928 he graduated from Tondi military school.

In 1939 he was temporary commander of the submarine Kalev. In 1944 he fled to Germany, then later to Australia. He died in Brisbane in 1983.

References

1904 births
1983 deaths
Estonian military personnel
Estonian politicians
Estonian World War II refugees
Estonian emigrants to Australia
People from Narva